Grand Forks station is a property in Grand Forks, North Dakota, United States, that was listed on the National Register of Historic Places in 1982 as the Northern Pacific Depot and Freight House.  It was used both as a passenger station and a freight warehouse/depot by the Northern Pacific Railway.

The station was built in 1929 and includes Tudor Revival architecture. The listing was for an area of less than one acre with just one contributing building.

The listing is described in its North Dakota Cultural Resources Survey document. It is one of two "outstanding" buildings, both one story, that "represent the Tudor Revival", within the Downtown Grand Forks area whose historic resources were surveyed in 1981;  the Lyons Garage is the other.  Both are "done in polychrome brick of yellow and red".

See also
Great Northern Freight Warehouse and Depot, also NRHP-listed in Grand Forks

References

Railway freight houses on the National Register of Historic Places
Railway stations on the National Register of Historic Places in North Dakota
Railway stations in the United States opened in 1929
Tudor Revival architecture in North Dakota
Former Northern Pacific Railway stations
National Register of Historic Places in Grand Forks, North Dakota
Former railway stations in North Dakota
1929 establishments in North Dakota